Shatrughna Swamy Temple is located in Payammal in Thrissur District of Kerala, India. This is one of the few temples in India that is dedicated to Lord Shatrughna, youngest brother of Lord Rama in the Hindu epic Ramayana. The Shatrughna Temple is the fourth temple which devotees visit when they embark on the Nalambalam (Four Temples) yatra or visit. Visiting Nalambalam is considered to be a sacred event during the Malayalam month of Karkidakam.

See also
 Nalambalam
 Temples of Kerala

References

Hindu temples in Thrissur district